Deltochilum scabriusculum is a species of (formerly canthonini) in the beetle family Scarabaeidae.

Subspecies
These two subspecies belong to the species Deltochilum scabriusculum:
 Deltochilum scabriusculum montanum Howden, 1966
 Deltochilum scabriusculum scabriusculum Bates, 1887

References

Further reading

 

Deltochilini
Articles created by Qbugbot
Beetles described in 1887